A total of 36 teams will contest the league divided into three groups, Lohko A (Group A), Lohko B (Group B) and Lohko C (Group C). 25 returning from the 2015 season, two relegated from Ykkönen and nine promoted from Kolmonen. The champion of each group and the best runner-up will qualify to promotion matches to decide which two teams get promoted to the Ykkönen. The bottom three teams in each group will qualify directly for relegation to Kolmonen. Each team will play a total of 22 matches, playing twice against each team of its group.

VIFK and MP were relegated from the 2015 Ykkönen, while KPV and GrIFK were promoted to the 2016 Ykkönen.

ÅIFK, FC Kiisto, FC Myllypuro, I-Kissat, JBK, JIPPO, KaaPo, Kerho 07, Masku, NJS, P-Iirot and PK Keski-Uusimaa were relegated from 2015 Kakkonen.

EsPa, FC Åland, FC Espoo, Hercules, MPS, PEPO, PPT, SC KuFu-98 and Virkiä were promoted from the 2015 Kolmonen.

ESC gave up its place in Kakkonen. The place was taken by FC Kontu.

Groups

Lohko A (Group A)

Lohko B (Group B)

Lohko C (Group C)

League tables

Lohko A (Group A)

Lohko B (Group B)

Lohko C (Group C)

Runner-up teams
At the end of the season, a comparison is made between the runners-up. The best runner-up will qualify to promotion matches.

Promotion play-offs
Group winners and the best runner-up will play two-legged ties. Team pairs will be drawn and the two winning teams will be promoted to the Ykkönen for season 2017.

Group winners

The best runner-up
MuSa

First leg

Second leg

1–1 on aggregate. Gnistan won 4–3 on penalties.

FC Honka won 4–3 on aggregate.

References

Kakkonen seasons
3
Fin
Fin